Johannes Jeep (pronounced "Yape"; also Johann or Jepp; 1581/1582 – 19 November 1644) was a German organist, choirmaster and composer.

Biography
Jeep, who was born in Dransfeld, Germany, is remembered for his choral writing. He collected his student songs in Studentengartlein, the first volume published in 1607, the second volume in 1609, and both published as a single volume in 1614. He also published more than one hundred hymns in the Hohenlohe Hymnbook in 1629.

He was one of the first German musicians to travel to Italy. In 1613, he was appointed director of music for the court of the Count of Hohenlohe, serving until 1625. Around 1635, he served as organist at Frankfurt Cathedral. In 1642, he was appointed conductor for the court of the Count of Hanau.  He died in Hanau, Germany.

His best-known song is the 4-part madrigal "Musica, die ganz lieblich Kunst" ("Music, the most lovely art").

Ulysses
The novelist James Joyce was an accomplished tenor. In Ulysses (Episode 16, "Eumaeus", 663:14-22), Joyce's autobiographical character, Stephen Dedalus, performs Jeep's spirited song "Von der Sirenen Listigkeit" ("Of the Siren's Cunning") for Leopold Bloom, and the two men bond over its misogyny.

See also
Johann Jeep from German Wikipedia.

External links
Musica, die ganz lieblich Kunst from YouTube.

1580s births
1644 deaths
People from Göttingen (district)
German classical composers
German Baroque composers
German organists
German male organists
German choral conductors
German male conductors (music)
17th-century classical composers
German male classical composers
17th-century male musicians